Walailak University Hospital is a university teaching hospital, affiliated to the School of Medicine of Walailak University, located in Tha Sala District, Nakhon Si Thammarat Province.

History 
The construction of Walailak University Hospital was proposed in 2011 and funding of 5.2 billion Baht was allocated in 2016 and construction started in March 2016. The first phase of the hospital opened on 24 February 2017. Construction for all six planned buildings is expected to be completed in 2020 and will expand to a capacity of 750 beds. 4 specialist medical centers will be completed which are: the Cardiac Center, Cancer Center, Skin Center and Elderly Center. Walailak University Hospital aims to be the future referral hospital for regional, general and community hospitals located in the upper Southern Thailand.

See also 

 Health in Thailand
 Hospitals in Thailand
 List of hospitals in Thailand

References 

 Article incorporates material from the corresponding article in the Thai Wikipedia.

Teaching hospitals in Thailand
Hospitals in Thailand
Nakhon Si Thammarat province